The Ministry of Culture's children book prize from Denmark (Danish: Kulturministeriets forfatterpris for børne- og ungdomsbøger also known as Kulturministeriets Børnebogspris) is a prize, which is given in order to honor a special effort for the Danish children's and youth book of high artistic quality. The award can be given either for a single title or for a whole work of an author. Along with the honor follows DKK 30.000, which partially comes from the "tipsmidler" (money from "Danske spil's" gambling, in Denmark a 66,44% of the money of gambling like lottery goes to cultural work and various kind of charity. In 2011 the "tipsmidler" gave a 1,5 billion Danish kroner profit which the government ministries must give to charitable purposes.

Recipients of the Prize 
 1954 – Egon Mathiesen: Mis med de blå øjne (Cat with blue eyes) and Alfred Johansen: Den grønne flaske (The green bottle)
 1956 – Poul Jeppesen: Henrik
 1957 – Palle Lauring: Stendolken (The stone dagger)
 1958 – Estrid Ott: Chico's lange vandring (Chico's long march)
 1959 – Tove Ditlevsen: Annelise – tretten år (Annelise – Thirteen years old)
 1960 – Karen Plovgaard: Sanne Karen Herold Olsen: Afrika (Africa)
 1961 – Poul E. Knudsen: Væddemålet og Arne Ungermann: Da solen blev forkølet (When the sun caught a cold)
 1962 – Thøger Birkeland: Når hanen galer (When the cock crows)
 1963 – Valborg Bjerge Hansen: Helle – ikke som de andre (Helle – not like the others), Marlie Brande: Da skoene løb med Laura (When the shoes ran with Laura) and Ib Spang Olsen: Drengen i månen (The boy in the moon)
 1964 – Ib Spang Olsen: Det lille lokomotiv (The Little Engine), Blæsten (The wind) and Regnen (The rain) and Mona and Peter Chr. Pedersen: Israel
 1965 – Halfdan Rasmussen: Børnerim (Nursery rhymes)
 1967 – Jan Møller: Borger i det gamle København (Citizen of the old Copenhagen) and Ib Spang Olsen: Mosekonens bryg (Marsh Woman's brewery)
 1968 – Cecil Bødker: Silas og den sorte hoppe (Silas and the black mare)
 1969 – Ole Lund Kirkegaard: Albert
 1970 – Erik Chr. Haugaard: De små fisk (The small fish)
 1971 – Benny Andersen: Snøvsen på sommerferie (Snøvsen on summer vacation)
 1972 – Per Holm Knudsen: Sådan får man et barn (This is how you get a child) and Niels Jensen: Da landet lå øde (When the country was deserted)
 1973 – Merete Kruuse: Rode-Rikke (Rooting-Rikke)
 1974 – Palle Petersen: 50 år i jernet (50 years in the iron)
 1975 – Inge Krog: Hjemmefra (Away from home)
 1976 – Leif Esper Andersen: Fremmed (Stranger)
 1977 – Bjarne Reuter: En dag i Hector Hansens liv (A day in Hector Hansen's life)
 1978 – Bent Haller: Indianeren (The Indian)
 1979 – Franz Berliner: Ulven som jager alene (The wolf who hunts alone) and Hævneren (Avenger)
 1980 – Lars-Henrik Olsen: Ræven i skoven (The fox in the woods)
 1981 – John Nehm: Stemplerne (The pistons) and Torben Weinreich: Manden i vinduet (The man in the window)
 1982 – Kirsten Holst: Også om mange år (Also for many years)
 1983 – Iris Garnov: Ud i det blå (Out in the blue) and Vinterøen (Winter island)
 1984 – Gerd Rindel: Øretævens vej, Slagsmål og silkebånd og Brændevin og vokseværk
 1985 – Peter Mouritzen: Haltefanden og Knud Erik Pedersen: Esben, Esben og Jakob and Esbens hemmelighed
 1986 – Søren Vagn Jacobsen: Krabbetågen
 1987 – Josefine Ottesen: Eventyret om fjeren og rosen
 1988 – Bent Rasmussen: Bitte Bødvar og banen
 1989 – Louis Jensen: Krystalmanden, Tusindfuglen, Hjerterejsen, Det grønne spor and Drageflyverne
 1990 – Kim Fupz Aakeson: Dengang min onkel Kulle blev skør and Stor og stærk
 1991 – Thomas Winding: Min lille hund Mester and Mester, min lille hund i natten
 1992 – Jens Peder Larsen: Brønden
 1993 – Lotte Inuk: Gina og Gina je t'aime
 1994 – Anders Johansen: Kærlighedens labyrint
 1995 – Bodil Bredsdorff: Krageungen, Eidi, Tink og Alek
 1996 – Dorte Karrebæk: Pigen der var go' til mange ting
 1997 – Cecilie Eken:  Sikkas fortælling
 1998 – Wivi Leth: Engle græder ikke
 1999 – Martin Petersen: Med ilden i ryggen
 2000 – Kåre Bluitgen: Niels Klims forunderlige rejse 1–4
 2001 – Janne Teller: Intet
 2002 – Bente Clod: Englekraft, I vilden sky og Himmelfald
 2003 – Kamilla Hega Holst: Den sovende sangerinde
 2004 – Daniel Zimakoff: En dødssyg ven
 2005 – Birgit Strandbygaard: Drengen der samlede på ord
 2006 – Charlotte Blay: Skrællingen – Tora i vinland
 2007 – Cecilie Eken: Mørkebarnet
 2008 – Josefine Ottesen: Golak
 2009 – Anita Krumbach: Et mærkeligt skib
 2010 – Jesper Wung-Sung: Kopierne
 2011 – Kim Fupz Aakeson: Jeg begyndte sådan set bare at gå
 2012 – Ronnie Andersen: Komatøs 
 2013 – Sanne Munk Jensen og Glenn Ringtved: Dig og mig ved daggry
 2014 – Mette Hegnhøj: Ella er mit navn vil du købe det?
 2015 – Mette Eike Neerlin: Hest, hest, tiger, tiger
 2016 – Hanne Kvist: Dyr med pels - og uden
 2017 – Mette Vedsø: Hest Horse pferd cheval love
 2018 – Jesper Wung-Sung: Aben og gabestokken
 2019 – Kathrine Assels: Mester Ester
 2020 – Adam O.: Den rustne verden. 3. del: Ukrudt

References

External links 
Litteraturpriser.dk, The Prizes of the Ministry of Culture

Danish literary awards